Jan Woltjer (4 February 1849, Groningen – 28 July 1917, Amsterdam) was a professor of Classical languages and literature at the Vrije Universiteit Amsterdam.

Woltjer, the son of a baker, started his career as an assistant teacher at a high school in his hometown of Groningen in 1867. He taught himself Latin and managed to enter the University of Groningen in 1871. While teaching classical languages at a local gymnasium, he wrote his dissertation on Lucretius and was promoted in 1877. On 28 September that year he married Marchien Janssonius. In 1881 he moved to Amsterdam to become professor at the Free University, which position he would keep until his death in 1917. In 1902 he became member of the Royal Netherlands Academy of Arts and Sciences. He was involved in many educational organizations and was a member of the Senate for the Anti Revolutionaire Partij from 1902 to 1917. His oldest son, Robert H. Woltjer, would follow him teaching classical studies at the Free University. His son Jan Woltjer Jr would become a well-known astronomer.

Along his many other students, including Herman Dooyeweerd, Woltjer had a formidable influence on future professor of philosophy, D. H. Th. Vollenhoven, who used his training in Greek and Latin to make first of all a minutely detailed study of the Fragments of the Presocratics. Woltjers subscribed to the idea that Greek learning was an integral part of what the New Testament refers to when it speaks of "the fulness of times." The Greek learned constituted a preparatory education (paideia, cf Werner Jaeger) for the coming of Christ. To some extent, Woltjer's student Vollenhoven seems to have resisted this latter conception, as V came to view the major problem of developing a Christian philosophy to be the heavy tendency of all subsequent Christian thought in Western culture to fall back on a synthesis with Greek-originated presuppositions.

References

Further reading 
Hartman, J.J. Levensbericht van Jan Woltjer. Amsterdam, 1918.
Nijhoff, Rob A. De logosfilosofie van Jan Woltjer (1849-1917): logos en wijsbegeerte aan de vroege Vrije Universiteit. Amsterdam: Buijten & Schipperheijn, 2014. Dutch with English summary
Osborne, Hansel E. “Van Til on Woltjer: The Biblical Structure of the Ideëel en Reëel”. Doctoral dissertation, Westminster Theological Seminary, 2009.
Slings, S.R. Jan Woltjer tegen de school van Cobet: een evaluatie van 'Overleving en kritiek' (1886). Volume 66, no. 3 of Mededelingen van de Afdeling Letterkunde, nieuwe reeks. Amsterdam: Koninklijke Nederlandse Akademie van Wetenschappen, 2003.
van der Laan, H. Jan Woltjer (1849-1917): Filosoof, Classicus, Pedagoog. Amsterdam: VU Uitgeverij, 2000.

1849 births
1917 deaths
Anti-Revolutionary Party politicians
Dutch classical scholars
Members of the Royal Netherlands Academy of Arts and Sciences
Members of the Senate (Netherlands)
People from Groningen (city)
University of Groningen alumni
Academic staff of Vrije Universiteit Amsterdam